The list that follows are the Shadow Cabinets led by David Cameron from 2005 to 2010, before he became Prime Minister.

Shadow Cabinet (8 December 2005 – 2 July 2007)

Shadow Cabinet (2 July 2007 – 13 June 2008)

Shadow Cabinet (13 June 2008 – 19 January 2009)

Shadow Cabinet (19 January 2009 – 11 May 2010)

External links

See also

Lists of British MPs
Conservative Party (UK)-related lists
British shadow cabinets
David Cameron
2005 in British politics
2005 establishments in the United Kingdom
2010 disestablishments in the United Kingdom
Official Opposition (United Kingdom)